Pakistan People's Party is a centre-left, social-democratic political party in Pakistan.

Pakistan Peoples Party may also refer to:
 Pakistan Peoples Party (Shaheed Bhutto), or PPP-SB, currently headed by Ghinwa Bhutto
 Pakistan Peoples Party (Sherpao), or PPP-S, currently headed by Aftab Ahmad Sherpao
 Pakistan Peoples Party Parliamentarians
 Pakistan Peoples Party Workers, a breakaway faction of Pakistan Peoples Party.